Hogenakkal may refer to:

Hogenakkal (village), a village in Tamil Nadu
Hogenakkal Falls, a waterfall on the Cauvery river in Tamil Nadu.
Hogenakkal Integrated Drinking Water Project
Hogenakkal Falls water dispute